Peter Hammer may refer to:

Peter L. Hammer (1936–2006), mathematician
Peter Hammer, fictional character in Senior Project (film)
, German publisher in Wuppertal

See also 
Pierre Marteau, a fictional German publishing house whose name means Peter Hammer